The Joseph H Scammell was a Canadian sailing ship that was built at Eatonville, Nova Scotia in 1884 and shipwrecked at Point Danger, Torquay, Victoria, Australia in 1891. Her wreck triggered a large scale episode of shipwreck pilfering and smuggling.

Construction

Joseph H Scammell was built at Eatonville a small village in Cumberland County, Nova Scotia. Today the village is a vanished ghost town in the middle of Cape Chignecto Provincial Park but in 1884 it was the centre of a large lumbering operation and a substantial shipyard. In 1884 the yard was run by the Scammell Brothers who named the ship after one of the family patriarchs. The ship was launched in September 1884 and registered at Saint John, New Brunswick, the nearest large port. She would sail under a Canadian flag for her entire career.

Wrecking 

On May 7, 1891, when the vessel was on its 114th day of its voyage from New York City to Melbourne, the Scammell had set a course for Port Phillip Heads when bad weather and rough seas dragged the ship towards shores where it ran aground on a reef near Point Danger of Torquay. There were 22 people aboard the Scammell, including the wife and daughter of Captain J A Chapman. The ship's dangerous position was first noticed by local fisherman at approximately 11 am. One of the fisherman, Felix Rosser, attempted to row out to the ship to provide assistance but was forced back to shore by strong seas. The following day after the seas had settled, the crew of the ship were able to lower a boat and evacuate all on board. Due to the incident, Captain J A Chapman had his master’s certificate suspended for 12 months for careless navigation and negligence.

Pilfering 

In the following days, the cargo of the ship was washed ashore and an estimated 2,000 locals began looting various merchandise which included tobacco, buggy sides, leather, clothing and kerosene. By the time customs officials and police arrived most of the $120,000 cargo had already been looted. Within a week a man from Geelong had purchased the Ship and its remaining cargo for $2628 from an auction held on the beach. The ship's deckhouse was bought and incorporated into the second floor of a house at 24 Pride street, Torquay.

Culture 

In late 2014, a performance outlining the Joseph H. Scammell's history was provided by several locals on the Torquay front beach.

References

Josehph H. Scammell Registry Information, Parks Canada, Ship Information Database
Plaque telling the story of the shipwreck

Shipwrecks of Victoria (Australia)
Maritime history of Canada
Transport in Cumberland County, Nova Scotia
Tall ships of Canada
Individual sailing vessels
Ships built in Nova Scotia
Victorian-era merchant ships of Canada
Sailing ships of Canada
1884 ships
Full-rigged ships